KMLK (98.7 FM, "The Heart and Soul") is an American radio station airing an urban contemporary format licensed to El Dorado, Arkansas. The station is owned by Noalmark Broadcasting Corporation.

It was formerly known as "Q99". On July 13, 2017, the then-KLBQ and its country format moved to 101.5 FM Junction City, swapping call signs and frequencies with urban adult contemporary-formatted KMLK.

References

External links

MLK
Noalmark Broadcasting Corporation radio stations
Radio stations established in 1963
1963 establishments in Arkansas
Urban contemporary radio stations in the United States
El Dorado, Arkansas